Robots is a 2005 American computer-animated science fiction adventure comedy film produced by Blue Sky Studios and distributed by 20th Century Fox. It was directed by Chris Wedge and written by David Lindsay-Abaire, Lowell Ganz and Babaloo Mandel from a story by Ron Mita, Jim McClain and Lindsay-Abaire. It stars the voices of Ewan McGregor, Halle Berry, Greg Kinnear, Mel Brooks,  Amanda Bynes, Drew Carey and Robin Williams. The story follows a robot named Rodney Copperbottom (McGregor) who seeks out his idol Bigweld (Brooks) at his company in Robot City, only to discover a plot by its new owner Ratchet (Kinnear) and his mother (Broadbent) to cheat older robots into buying expensive upgrades.

Development on the film began in 2000, when Wedge and William Joyce failed to adapt Joyce's 1993 book Santa Calls and they decided to do a story on robots. Robots was theatrically released on March 11, 2005. It grossed $262.5 million worldwide against a $75 million budget and received generally positive reviews.

Plot

In Rivet Town, Rodney Copperbottom, son of Herb and Lydia Copperbottom, is an aspiring young inventor. He idolizes Bigweld, a famous inventor, entrepreneur, and philanthropist whose company, Bigweld Industries, hires other inventors and provides robots with spare parts. Following Bigweld's example to "see a need, fill a need", Rodney develops a small, flying robot, named Wonderbot, to assist his father, Herb, who works as a dishwasher at a restaurant. When Herb's supervisor Mr. Gunk confronts them, Wonderbot malfunctions and wreaks havoc in the kitchen.

In an attempt to help Herb pay for the damages, Rodney decides to move to Robot City, hoping to present Wonderbot to Bigweld Industries. Upon his arrival, Rodney is ejected from Bigweld Industries by the company's current head Phineas T. Ratchet, who, in Bigweld's absence, has stopped producing spare parts and inventions in favor of expensive "upgrades", thereby "outmoding" robots who are unable or unwilling to pay for them. Meanwhile, Ratchet's mother, Madame Gasket, runs the Chop Shop, a facility that collects scrap and spare parts (and sometimes outmoded robots) and recycles them into ingots for Upgrades.

After failing to get into Bigweld Industries, Rodney befriends Fender Pinwheeler, a ne'er-do-well he met at the train station. Fender takes him in to a boarding home populated by other outmodes, known collectively as the "Rusties". Word of Rodney's mechanical prowess spreads, and he is hailed as a local hero after he and the Rusties fix outmodes throughout the neighborhood, although they are eventually unable to cope with the demand due to the spare part shortage. Hoping to enlist Bigweld's help, Rodney and Fender infiltrate the Bigweld Ball – where Bigweld usually makes an appearance – only for Ratchet to announce that Bigweld will not attend. Enraged, Rodney publicly berates Ratchet, who orders his security team to eliminate him. Cappy, a Bigweld Industries executive opposed to Ratchet's plans, rescues Rodney and Fender. Fender is captured by a Sweeper, a Chop Shop refuse collection vehicle, where he discovers Gasket and Ratchet's plan to use a fleet of Super-Sweepers to collectively scrap and smelt every outmode in the city.

Meanwhile, Rodney and Cappy fly to Bigweld's mansion, where they eventually find Bigweld and tell him what has been going on. Bigweld reveals Ratchet's greed and business sense dwarfed his idealism in the management of Bigweld Industries leading to his resignation and tells Rodney and Cappy to leave. Crushed, Rodney calls his parents and plans to return to Rivet Town. Herb encourages Rodney to fight for his dreams, or he will spend the rest of his life regretting it like Herb did. Fender returns upon escaping from the Chop Shop and reveals Ratchet and Gasket's plot. Rodney rallies Cappy and the Rusties to stop them. They are joined by Bigweld, who has regained his resolve after Rodney helped him realize how much his ideals meant to himself.

The group returns to Bigweld Industries where Bigweld fires Ratchet, who ultimately knocks him unconscious, planning on recycling him as well. Rodney, Cappy, and Wonderbot rescue Bigweld from Ratchet and escape with the Rusties in a security vehicle with Ratchet close behind. Rodney unclips Ratchet's vehicle to break free, but their vehicle loses control in front of the Chop Shop and Bigweld is rolled inside. Refusing to give up, Rodney upgrades the Rusties to rescue Bigweld. Rodney, Cappy, and the Rusties, alongside an army of outmodes that Rodney had repaired earlier, battle Ratchet, Gasket, and their army of workers. Rodney and Bigweld immobilize the Super-Sweepers and defeat Ratchet, who accidentally kills his mother by knocking her into the incinerator while trying to escape. Ratchet is accidentally stripped of his upgrades and left chained to the ceiling with his father.

Taking back control of Bigweld Industries, Bigweld promises to make spare parts available to everyone. Later, he holds a public ceremony in Rivet Town, where he nominates Rodney as his new second-in-command and eventual successor. Rodney provides Herb with new replacement parts and a flugelhorn-like instrument to fulfill his dream of being a musician. After a shaky start, Herb leads Rodney, Cappy, the Rusties, Bigweld and the townspeople in a rousing rendition of "Get Up Offa That Thing" as the film ends.

Voice cast

 Ewan McGregor as Rodney Copperbottom, an idealistic young blue robot and aspiring inventor.
 Will Denton and Crawford Wilson as Rodney (teenager)
 Jansen Panettiere as Rodney (child)
 Dylan Denton as Rodney (baby)
 Halle Berry as Cappy, a straight-laced human-themed executive at Bigweld Industries and Rodney's love interest.
 Robin Williams as Fender Pinwheeler, a mischievous red blender-like robot who befriends Rodney and is constantly falling apart.
 Mel Brooks as Bigweld, an elderly sphere robot who is the caring inventor and founder of Bigweld Industries.
 Greg Kinnear as Phineas T. Ratchet, the menacing and arrogant right-hand-man of Bigweld and Madame Gasket's son. 
 Jim Broadbent as Madame Gasket, the evil owner of the Chop Shop.
 Amanda Bynes as Piper Pinwheeler, a plucky yellow tomboy robot who is Fender's younger sister.
 Drew Carey as Crank Casey, a cynical orange vacuum cleaner/monster truck-like robot who befriends Rodney.
 Jennifer Coolidge as Aunt Fanny (in the US version, also known as Aunt Fan in the UK version), a motherly snail-like robot who takes in outmoded and homeless robots.
 Harland Williams as Lugnut or "Lug", an imposing but good-natured green muscular robot who befriends Rodney along with his mute best friend Diesel. 
 Alan Rosenberg as Jack Hammer, a rusty copperish orange robot who works at a hardware store.
 Stanley Tucci as Herb Copperbottom, Rodney's father and a dishwasher at Gunk's Greasy Spoon.
 Dianne Wiest as Lydia Copperbottom, Rodney's mother.
 Chris Wedge as Wonderbot, a small helicopter/cup-like robot, who is Rodney's invention.
 Natasha Lyonne (in the US version) and Cat Deeley (in the UK version) as Loretta Geargrinder, a receptionist at Bigweld Industries and Fender's love interest.
 Paul Giamatti as Tim, the puppet gatekeeper at Bigweld Industries.
 Dan Hedaya as Mr. Gunk, Herb's cynical, inconsiderate boss.
 Brian Scott McFadden as Trashcan Bot
 Jay Leno as Fire Hydrant
 Lucille Bliss as Pigeon Lady
 Paula Abdul as Wristwatch #1
 Randy Jackson as Wristwatch #2
 Al Roker as Mailbox
 Marshall Efron as Lamp Post, Toilet Bot, Bass Drum, and Microphone
 Randall Montgomery as Zinc, a ramshackle car robot
 Stephen Tobolowsky as Bigmouth Executive / Forge (in the US version), and Eamonn Holmes (in the UK version).
 Tim Nordquist as Tin Man
 Terry Wogan (in the UK version), Lowell Ganz (in the US version) as Mr. Gasket, Madame Gasket's husband and Ratchet's father.
 James Earl Jones as a voice box.
 Bob Bergen as Robot #4

Production

Initially, Chris Wedge and William Joyce had decided to make a film adaptation of Joyce's book, Santa Calls. After a failed animation test in 2000, Wedge and Joyce decided to develop an original story about a world of robots instead. In 2001, the duo pitched the concept to then-20th Century Fox Animation president Chris Meledandri, as a visual idea. While not initially impressed, Meledandri agreed to greenlight the film, and served as the executive producer. The film began production in  2002, shortly after Ice Age was released. Wedge reunited with the crew from his first film, including Carlos Saldanha as the co-director. In June 2003, the film was announced by Fox at the American Museum of Natural History's IMAX theater. This announcement confirmed the entire cast, and slated the film for its 2005 release.

Release
Robots was originally scheduled for a 2004 release, but the release date was changed to 2005. The film premiered on March 6, 2005 in Westwood, Los Angeles, and it was released theatrically on March 11, 2005. The film was the first to feature the new trailer for Star Wars: Episode III – Revenge of the Sith, where it was reported that Star Wars fans went to see the movie just to see the trailer and hear the voice of Ewan McGregor, who also played Obi Wan Kenobi in the Star Wars prequel trilogy, as Rodney Copperbottom. The film also featured the exclusive trailer for Blue Sky's next film Ice Age: The Meltdown, then called Ice Age 2. Robots was digitally re-mastered into IMAX format (IMAX DMR) and released in select IMAX theatres around the world. It was the first 20th Century Fox film that was released on the same day on IMAX and conventional 35mm screens. It was also the first IMAX DMR film released in the spring season, and the second IMAX DMR film distributed by Fox.

Home media
The film was released on DVD and VHS in both fullscreen and widescreen on September 27, 2005, was accompanied by an original short animated film based on Robots, titled Aunt Fanny's Tour of Booty. The film was released in high-definition on Blu-ray Disc on March 22, 2011.

Reception

Box office
The film was released March 11, 2005, in the United States and Canada and grossed $36 million in 3,776 theaters its opening weekend, ranking #1 at the box office. It grossed a total of $260.7 million worldwide—$128.2 million in the United States and Canada and $132.5 million in other territories.

Critical response
The site's consensus reads: "Robots delights on a visual level, but the story feels like it came off an assembly line." Metacritic, gives the film a weighted average score of 64 out of 100 based on 33 reviews, indicating "generally favorable reviews". Audiences surveyed by CinemaScore gave the film a grade "A" on scale of A+ to F.

Roger Ebert of the Chicago Sun-Times gave the film three and a half stars out of four, stating that "this is a movie that is a joy to behold entirely apart from what it is about. It looks happy, and, more to the point, it looks harmonious." Caroline Westbrook of the Empire Magazine gave the film a three out of five stars and said, "Kids will love it and their adult companions will be warmly entertained - but it's far from a computer-animated classic." Rob Mackie of The Guardian gave the film a three out of five stars, saying, "skilfully combines adult and kids' comedy. But For all the imaginative splendours and a sharp script, Robots is never quite as distinctive as its predecessor, Ice Age." Common Sense Media gave the film a four out of five stars and said: "Endearing 'follow your dreams' story with plenty of laughs."

Accolades
Robots won an ASCAP award in the category of top box office films. The movie received two Annie Award nominations (Outstanding Character Design in a Feature Production and Outstanding Production Design in an Animated Feature Production; both for William Joyce and Steve Martino for the latter) and two Kid's Choice Award nominations (Favorite Animated Movie and Favorite Voice From an Animated Movie for Robin Williams' performance as Fender). Robots was also nominated for a Teen Choice Award (Choice Movie: Animated/Computer Generated) and a Visual Effects Society Award.

The film is recognized by American Film Institute in these lists:
 2008: AFI's 10 Top 10: Nominated Animation Film

Music

Score

Robots: Original Motion Picture Score was composed by John Powell and was released on March 15, 2005 by Varèse Sarabande and Fox Music.

Other songs in the film include
 "Underground" – Tom Waits
 "Shine" – Ricky Fanté (end credits)
 "Can't Get Enough of Your Love, Babe" – Barry White
 "...Baby One More Time" – Britney Spears
 "See Me" – Melanie Blatt
 "Eye of the Tiger" – Survivor
 "From Zero to Hero" – Sarah Connor
 "Gonna Make You Sweat (Everybody Dance Now)" – C+C Music Factory and Freedom Williams
 "(There's Gotta Be) More to Life" – Stacie Orrico
 "Right Thurr" – Chingy
 "Low Rider" - War
 "I Like That" – Houston
 "Get Up Offa That Thing" - James Brown

Video game

A video game based on the film, was released on February 24, 2005 for the Game Boy Advance, GameCube, Nintendo DS, PlayStation 2, Xbox and Windows. It was developed by Eurocom for the consoles and PC and by Griptonite Games for the Game Boy Advance and Nintendo DS, it was published by Vivendi Universal Games. The game would receive mixed to average reviews from critics.

Aunt Fanny's Tour of Booty
Aunt Fanny's Tour of Booty is a five-minute computer-animated film that was included as a bonus feature on the DVD and Asian Blu-ray releases of Robots and is a prequel to the film, as it takes place during Fender's arrival at Robot City. In the short, Aunt Fanny/Fan gives a tour of the Robot City Train Station to a motley collection of robots, including Fender Pinwheeler, Zinc, Tammy, Hacky, and an Old Lady-Bot.  It was never included in both US and European Blu-ray releases, possibly due to a request from the Office of Film and Literature Classification (OFLC) to remove the short on the Australian DVD release since they gave the short a PG rating.

Future
Following its release, both Wedge and Joyce have expressed interest in doing a sequel.
	
In light of the Release the Snyder Cut movement and the closure of Blue Sky Studios, a movement to release a director's cut of Robots has gained traction. A proposed director's cut was first mentioned on the film's original DVD audio commentary with Wedge and Joyce, where Wedge went on that there would be alternate takes in certain scenes and Cappy would've been more fleshed out.

References

External links

 
 
 
 

2000s American animated films
2000s science fiction comedy films
2000s adventure comedy films
2005 computer-animated films
2005 films
2005 comedy films
20th Century Fox animated films
20th Century Fox films
20th Century Fox Animation films
American animated science fiction films
American adventure comedy films
American science fiction comedy films
Blue Sky Studios films
American computer-animated films
Films scored by John Powell
Films directed by Carlos Saldanha
Films directed by Chris Wedge
IMAX films
American robot films
Animated films about robots
Films with screenplays by Babaloo Mandel
Films with screenplays by Lowell Ganz
Films with screenplays by David Lindsay-Abaire
2000s children's animated films
2000s English-language films